The 1987 October Revolution Parade was a parade on Red Square to celebrate the 70th anniversary of the October Revolution of 1917. It took place in Moscow on November 7, 1987. Marshal of the Soviet Union and the Minister of Defence Dmitry Yazov inspected the parade. Commanding the parade was the commander of the Moscow Garrison Vladimir Arkhipov. Music was performed by the head of Moscow Garrison's central band, Major General Nikolai Mikhailov. General Secretary of the Communist Party of the Soviet Union Mikhail Gorbachev and other members of the Politburo were on the grandstand of Lenin's Mausoleum in Red Square.

Parade Units

Military Bands
 Massed Bands of the Moscow Military District under the direction of Major General Nikolai Mikhailov, Senior Director of Music of the Bands Service
 Corps of Drums of the Moscow Military Music College (recently awarded the Komsomol Prize)

Ground Column
Leading the column was the limousine carrying the parade commander, Col. General Vladimir Arkhipov, the commanding general of the Moscow Military District.

 Historical Units
 Russian Revolution Regiment
 Combined Color Guard consisting of 50 Civil War era colors
 Red Guards
 Former Imperial Russian Army personnel with the Red Army
 Naval contingent
 Red Army personnel of 1922
 Historical Cavalry Units
 Great Patriotic War Regiment
 12 member tri-services color guard led by the Victory Banner
 Combined Color Guard
 Historical "Warrior-Liberators" Unit
 Frunze Military Academy
 V. I. Lenin Military Political Academy
 Felix Dzerzhinsky Artillery Academy
 Military Armored Forces Academy Marshal Rodion Malinovsky
 Military Engineering Academy
 Military Academy of Chemical Defense and Control
 Yuri Gagarin Air Force Academy
 Prof. Nikolai Zhukovsky Air Force Engineering Academy
 Naval Engineering School
 Moscow Border Guards Institute of the Border Defence Forces of the KGB "Moscow City Council"
 Moscow Garrison units:
98th Guards Airborne Division
 OMSDON
 336th Marine Regiment of the Baltic Fleet
 Suvorov Military School
 Nakhimov Naval School
 Moscow Military High Command Training School "Supreme Soviet of the Russian SFSR"

Mobile column
 2nd Guards Tamanskaya Motorized Rifle Division
BRDM-2
 BTR-70
 BMP-2
 98th Airborne Division
 BMD-1
 4th Guards Kantermirovsky Tank Division
T-72
 Rocket Forces and Artillery
 2S9 Nona
 2S1 Gvozdika
 2S3 Akatsiya
 BM-21 Grad

International dignitaries 
 Cuba - Fidel Castro
 East Germany - Erich Honecker
 Bulgaria - Todor Zhivkov
 Poland - Wojciech Jaruzelski
 Romania - Nicolae Ceaușescu
 Ethiopia - Mengistu Haile Mariam
 Hungary - János Kádár
 Mongolia - Jambyn Batmönkh
 Kampuchea- Norodom Sihanouk

Gallery

Notes

References

October Revolution parades
1987 in Russia
November 1987 events in Europe
1987 in Moscow